Valley Ford is an unincorporated community and census-designated place (CDP) in western Sonoma County, California, United States. It is located on State Route 1 north of San Francisco. Like all of Sonoma County, Valley Ford is included in both the San Francisco Bay Area and the Redwood Empire.

The Estero Americano is protected by the Estero Americano State Marine Recreational Management Area.

History
For millennia, the indigenous Coast Miwok and Pomo people have hunted, fished and gathered in the area. A Miwok village named Ewapalt has been documented in the Valley Ford area.

The Russians remained until 1841, when the area came under Mexican rule. In September 1850, California became a US state, the area was made part of Sonoma County.

Valley Ford had a grain mill in the mid-19th century.  Starting in the 1870s, Valley Ford was a stop on the North Pacific Coast Railroad connecting Cazadero to the Sausalito ferry, enabling local ranchers and fishers to export produce to San Francisco.

In 1976, Christo and Jeanne-Claude's installation art piece Running Fence passed through Valley Ford on its way from Cotati to Bodega Bay.

Open from 1856 to 1967, Watson School once served as Valley Ford's school, and is located in a Sonoma County Regional Parks Department historic park about 3.5 miles north of Valley Ford.

Geography
According to the United States Census Bureau, the CDP covers an area of 2.6 square miles (6.8 km), all of it land.

Demographics
The population at the 2020 United States census was 148.

The 2010 United States Census reported that Valley Ford had a population of 147. The racial makeup of the CDP was 71.4% European American, 0.7% African American, 22.4% from other races, and 5.4% from two or more races. 35.4% of the population was Hispanic or Latino of any race.

The Census reported that 100% of the population lived in households.

There were 57 households, out of which 18 (31.6%) had children under the age of 18 living in them, 26 (45.6%) were opposite-sex married couples living together, 8 (14.0%) had a female householder with no husband present, 1 (1.8%) had a male householder with no wife present.  There were 6 (10.5%) unmarried opposite-sex partnerships, and 3 (5.3%) same-sex married couples or partnerships. 13 households (22.8%) were made up of individuals, and 5 (8.8%) had someone living alone who was 65 years of age or older. The average household size was 2.58.  There were 35 families (61.4% of all households); the average family size was 3.20.

The population was spread out, with 35 people (23.8%) under the age of 18, 12 people (8.2%) aged 18 to 24, 42 people (28.6%) aged 25 to 44, 35 people (23.8%) aged 45 to 64, and 23 people (15.6%) who were 65 years of age or older.  The median age was 39.5 years. For every 100 females, there were 116.2 males.  For every 100 females age 18 and over, there were 115.4 males.

There were 67 housing units at an average density of 25.4 per square mile (9.8/km), of which 47.4% were owner-occupied and 52.6% were occupied by renters. The homeowner vacancy rate was 0%; the rental vacancy rate was 3.1%. 39.5% of the population lived in owner-occupied housing units and 60.5% lived in rental housing units.

Nitrates in Groundwater
Warnings of high nitrate levels associated with surrounding dairy ranches have led some residents to drink, cook and even bathe with bottled water. Some dining establishments have resorted to relying on water delivered from Petaluma. In early 2017, the State Water Resources Control Board issued a warning that pregnant women and infants younger than 6 months should not consume the town's well water. The warning also cautioned against boiling, freezing or filtering the water.[7]

Businesses
Valley Ford is home to antique stores, art galleries, curio shops and restaurants:
 Valley Ford Hotel, one of the few remaining buildings dating from the 19th century, now houses Rocker Oysterfeller's Kitchen & Saloon and six guest rooms.
 West County Design, a gallery for wood tables, polished concrete and other products of Sonoma County artisans,.
The Valley Ford Market features the regionally well-known Batemon's Meats.
 Valley Ford Construction Corporation, Valley Ford Construction Corporation, General Engineering.
 The headquarters of capo manufacturer Shubb is also in Valley Ford.
 Carolyn's Canvas manufactures a variety of canvas goods.

References

7. Bucolic Valley Ford faces water problems linked to dairies

External links

 County of Sonoma Watson School Restoration Project

Census-designated places in Sonoma County, California
Unincorporated communities in California
Census-designated places in California
Unincorporated communities in Sonoma County, California